Parapuzosia seppenradensis is the largest known species of ammonite. It lived during the Lower Campanian Epoch of the Late Cretaceous period, in marine environments in what is now Westphalia, Germany. A specimen, found in Seppenrade near Lüdinghausen, Germany in 1895 measures  in diameter, although the living chamber is incomplete. 

The original fossil is shown in the foyer of the Westphalian Museum of Natural History, Münster, Germany.

See also

Cephalopod size

References

  Kennedy, W.J. & U. Kaplan 1995. Parapuzosia (Parapuzosia) seppenradensis (Landois) und die Ammonitenfauna der Dülmener Schichten, unteres Unter-Campan, Westfalen. Geologie und Paläontologie in Westfalen 33: 1–127.

Cretaceous ammonites
Fossil taxa described in 1895